The 1978 FISA Lightweight Championships were held in Copenhagen, Denmark from 3 to 6 August 1978. In the history of the World Rowing Championships, 1978 was the only year when the lightweight rowing championships were not held in conjunction with the open men and women event. (Other years in which championships were held separately for lightweights were Olympic years, in which there were no openweight World Championships.)  The lightweight finals were raced on 6 August. The event was held at Lake Bagsværd. In 1978, a fourth boat class was added to the event: Lightweight double scull.

Later in 1978, the open event went to the Southern Hemisphere for the first time and was held at Lake Karapiro near Cambridge, New Zealand.

Medal summary

Finals

Great Britain
Three teams from Great Britain competed at the championships.

References

Rowing competitions in Denmark
World Rowing Championships
Lightweight Championships
International sports competitions hosted by Denmark
1978 in Danish sport
Rowing